The men's 400 metres event at the 1993 Summer Universiade was held at the UB Stadium in Buffalo, United States on 15, 16 and 17 July 1993.

Medalists

Results

Heats

Quarterfinals

Semifinals

Final

References

Athletics at the 1993 Summer Universiade
1993